Shane Kalani del Rosario (September 23, 1983 – December 9, 2013) was an American professional mixed martial artist and kickboxer.  He competed in the Ultimate Fighting Championship's Heavyweight division, Strikeforce, M-1 Global, ShoXC, and King of the Cage.  He held the distinction of being the first American to become the WBC Muay Thai World Heavyweight Champion.

Early life
Del Rosario was born and raised in Orange County, California, and was half-Filipino American. He started training as a fighter at the age of 17 with Marco Ruas. Del Rosario then attended and graduated from college with a bachelor's degree in psychology out of UC Irvine.

Kickboxing career
Del Rosario competed as a Heavyweight in Muay Thai on the World Championship Kickboxing series of kickboxing events and In Sync Productions Inc.

On November 9, 2006, Shane Del Rosario fought Tyler Grear. After surviving a spinning backfist that stunned him in round one, Del Rosario dropped Grear with a power punch early in round two. Grear could not beat the referee's 10-count as Del Rosario was declared the winner by knockout at 16 seconds of the second round.

After defeating Justin Carver by first-round knockout on January 11, 2007, Shane then fought reigning WBC Muay Thai International Heavyweight Champion Ricardo van den Bos for the vacant WBC Muay Thai World Heavyweight Championship. Del Rosario dominated van den Bos throughout the majority of the bout. After dropping van den Bos twice in round number two, Del Rosario landed a knee that finished Ricardo van den Bos at the last second of the round. He was then declared the winner by knockout at 3:00 of round two and the new WBC Muay Thai World Heavyweight Champion. He would also become the first American to have won the WBC Muay Thai World Heavyweight title.

Del Rosario's first career loss came in his first title defense against Dutch kickboxer Ginty Vrede. Going into the bout as the fan favorite, he appeared to hurt Vrede in the opening round. Vrede came back with a powerful hook that stunned del Rosario and forced a standing eight-count by referee Steve Mazzagatti. After beating the count, del Rosario was dropped by an immediate high kick. The referee stopped the fight at 2:24 of the first round and declared Vrede the new WBC Muay Thai World Heavyweight Champion.

Following Vrede's death, the WBC World Heavyweight Championship was vacated. Del Rosario then knocked out Mexican kickboxer Ricardo Romero at 1:20 in the second round on July 26, 2008 to win the title for a second time.

Mixed martial arts career
Shane del Rosario transitioned into mixed martial arts in 2006 when he made his debut for mixed martial arts promotion King of the Cage. He then competed for notable promotions including EliteXC, M-1 Global and Strikeforce.

Strikeforce
Shane del Rosario defeated Brandon Cash in his Strikeforce debut. He was expected to face Bobby Lashley at Strikeforce: Miami, but the bout never materialized.  He was then expected to meet Ron Sparks at Strikeforce: Los Angeles on June 16, but that bout also never happened. Shane won against Lolohea Mahe by way of TKO on July 23, 2010 at Strikeforce Challengers: del Rosario vs. Mahe. After the bout, Shane expressed his desire to fight former UFC heavyweight champion Andrei Arlovski.

On February 12, 2011, Del Rosario competed in an alternate bout for Strikeforce's World Grand Prix Heavyweight Tournament. He faced Lavar Johnson and won the bout with an armbar submission in the closing minute of the first round to earn the first reserve spot in the tournament.

He was to face Daniel Cormier at Strikeforce: Overeem vs. Werdum, but was involved in a car accident in which a drunk woman hit his car from the back. As a result, from the accident, he suffered a herniated disc which kept him from training as well as forcing him to withdraw from the bout.

Ultimate Fighting Championship

Del Rosario's manager Jason House announced that he had signed to the UFC to compete in the Heavyweight division, starting in 2012.

Del Rosario was expected to face Gabriel Gonzaga on May 26, 2012 at UFC 146. Due to Alistair Overeem testing positive for high levels of testosterone, Frank Mir replaced him for the title shot which promoted Antônio Silva to fight for the co-main event against Cain Velasquez. The move left Roy Nelson with no opponent, which prompted the UFC to let him face former title contender Gonzaga while del Rosario faced Stipe Miocic. del Rosario was defeated in the second round by TKO, giving him his first professional MMA career loss.

Del Rosario faced Pat Barry at The Ultimate Fighter: Team Carwin vs. Team Nelson Finale. He lost the fight by knockout at 0:26 of the second round.  Afterwards, Del Rosario was expected to face Dave Herman on July 6, 2013 at UFC 162, but was forced to withdraw from the bout due to an injury and was replaced by Gabriel Gonzaga.

Del Rosario was expected to face Guto Inocente on December 28, 2013 at UFC 168.  Del Rosario pulled out of the bout in October citing a rib injury.

Cardiac arrest and death

On November 26, 2013, del Rosario was hospitalized at Hoag Memorial Hospital Presbyterian in Newport Beach, California after suffering full cardiac arrest following two heart attacks. According to Del Rosario's manager, Jason House, in a statement to Sherdog.com, del Rosario suffered a catastrophic cardiovascular collapse at home and was rushed to the hospital, where he was resuscitated in the emergency room back to a stable heart rhythm and blood pressure. According to Erik Apple, a training partner who had known del Rosario since they were in high school, del Rosario's liver and kidneys were not functioning and he had been put on dialysis.

ESPN reported del Rosario had died on November 28, and this was repeated in various outlets. The credited author denied having written the story, and later reported del Rosario alive, though without brain activity. On November 30, del Rosario was taken off life support and breathing on his own. He also registered brain activity and squeezed his mother's hand. Despite the improvements in his condition, del Rosario died on December 9, 2013.

A drug toxicology screen performed at the time of del Rosario's death indicated that he had recently used cocaine and opiates. However, the immediate causes of death listed on his death certificate are anoxic encephalopathy, ventricular fibrillation and Long QT Syndrome, and additionally that "other significant conditions contributing to death but not resulting in the underlying cause" were cocaine and opiates.

Championships and accomplishments

Mixed martial arts
Strikeforce
Strikeforce Heavyweight Grand Prix Tournament Reserve

Kickboxing
World Boxing Council Muaythai
2008 WBC Muaythai World Heavyweight Championship 
2007 WBC Muaythai World Heavyweight Championship

Mixed martial arts record

|-
| Loss
| align=center| 11–2
| Pat Barry
| KO (punches)
| The Ultimate Fighter: Team Carwin vs. Team Nelson Finale
| 
| align=center| 2
| align=center| 0:26
| Las Vegas, Nevada, United States
| 
|-
| Loss
| align=center| 11–1
| Stipe Miocic
| TKO (elbows)
| UFC 146
| 
| align=center| 2
| align=center| 3:14
| Las Vegas, Nevada, United States
| 
|-
| Win
| align=center| 11–0
| Lavar Johnson
| Submission (armbar)
| Strikeforce: Fedor vs. Silva
| 
| align=center| 1
| align=center| 4:31
| East Rutherford, New Jersey, United States
| 
|-
| Win
| align=center| 10–0
| Lolohea Mahe
| TKO (knees and punches)
| Strikeforce Challengers: del Rosario vs. Mahe
| 
| align=center| 1
| align=center| 3:48
| Everett, Washington, United States
| 
|-
| Win
| align=center| 9–0
| Brandon Cash
| Submission (omoplata)
| Strikeforce Challengers: Gurgel vs. Evangelista
| 
| align=center| 1
| align=center| 2:57
| Fresno, California, United States
| 
|-
| Win
| align=center| 8–0
| Lloyd Marshbanks
| TKO (knees)
| M-1 Challenge 19: 2009 Semifinals
| 
| align=center| 1
| align=center| 1:34
| Rostov-on-Don, Russia
| 
|-
| Win
| align=center| 7–0
| Maxim Grishin
| TKO (punches)
| M-1 Challenge 17: Korea
| 
| align=center| 1
| align=center| 0:21
| Seoul, South Korea
| 
|-
| Win
| align=center| 6–0
| Dool Hee-Lee
| TKO (body punch)
| M-1 Challenge 14: Japan
| 
| align=center| 1
| align=center| 2:27
| Tokyo, Japan
| 
|-
| Win
| align=center| 5–0
| Carl Seumanutafa
| TKO (punches)
| ShoXC: Elite Challenger Series
| 
| align=center| 2
| align=center| 1:07
| Santa Ynez, California, United States
| 
|-
| Win
| align=center| 4–0
| Analu Brash
| TKO (punches)
| ShoXC: Elite Challenger Series
| 
| align=center| 1
| align=center| 3:18
| Santa Ynez, California, United States
| 
|-
| Win
| align=center| 3–0
| Amedeo Viola
| Submission (triangle choke)
| ShoXC: Elite Challenger Series
| 
| align=center| 1
| align=center| 2:27
| Santa Ynez, California, United States
| 
|-
| Win
| align=center| 2–0
| Gilbert Carreto
| TKO (punches)
| No Limits: Proving Grounds
| 
| align=center| 1
| align=center| 1:19
| Irvine, California, United States
| 
|-
| Win
| align=center| 1–0
| Gábor Németh
| TKO (punches)
| KOTC: Rapid Fire
| 
| align=center| 1
| align=center| 3:53
| San Jacinto, California, United States
|

Kickboxing record (Incomplete)

|- style="background:#cfc;"
|style="text-align:center"|Win
| Raul Romero
|KO
|World Championship Kickboxing: Full Rules Muay Thai
|
|style="text-align:center"|2
|style="text-align:center"|1:20
| Las Vegas, Nevada
|-
| style="background:white; font-weight:bold" colspan=9 |
|- style="background:#fbb;"
|style="text-align:center"|Loss
| Ginty Vrede
|TKO 
|World Championship Kickboxing: Full Rules Muay Thai
|
|style="text-align:center"|1
|style="text-align:center"|2:24
| Las Vegas, Nevada
|-
| style="background:white; font-weight:bold" colspan=9 |
|- style="background:#cfc;"
|style="text-align:center"|Win
| Ricardo van den Bos
|KO 
|World Championship Kickboxing: Full Rules Muay Thai
|
|style="text-align:center"|2
|style="text-align:center"|3:00
| Gardena, California
|-
| style="background:white; font-weight:bold" colspan=9 |
|- style="background:#cfc;"
|style="text-align:center"|Win
| Justin Carver
|KO
|World Championship Kickboxing: Full Rules Muay Thai
|
|style="text-align:center"|1
|style="text-align:center"|1:58
| Highland, California
|- style="background:#cfc;"
|style="text-align:center"|Win
| Tyler Grear
|KO
|World Championship Kickboxing: Full Rules Muay Thai
|
|style="text-align:center"|2
|style="text-align:center"|0:16
| Highland, California
|-

|Legend:

See also
 List of current UFC fighters

References

External links
 
 
 

1983 births
2013 deaths
American male kickboxers
Kickboxers from California
Heavyweight kickboxers
American male mixed martial artists
Heavyweight mixed martial artists
Mixed martial artists utilizing Muay Thai
Mixed martial artists utilizing Brazilian jiu-jitsu
American Muay Thai practitioners
American practitioners of Brazilian jiu-jitsu
American mixed martial artists of Filipino descent
American people of Spanish descent
American people of Norwegian descent
People from Hacienda Heights, California
Sportspeople from Irvine, California
Mixed martial artists from California
Ultimate Fighting Championship male fighters